Kırkkavak is a village in Mut district of Mersin Province, Turkey. Population of Kırkkavak  was 396 as of 2012.

References

Villages in Mut District